Prater Island (Praterinsel) is one of the two islands in the Isar in Munich. The other is Museum Island.

Geography of Munich
Islands of Bavaria